I'm All Good is a 2008 Czech comedy film directed by Jan Hřebejk.

Cast 
Boleslav Polívka – Mrklas alias Mr. Class
Jiří Schmitzer – Tonda
Lenka Vlasáková – Andula
Josef Somr – Balun 
Miroslav Vladyka – Kája
Vladimír Javorský – Pepé
Petr Forman – Láďa
Dalibor Vinklát – Franta
Simona Babčáková – Jitka, Kája's wife
Boris Hybner 
Jakub Kohák

External links
 

2008 comedy films
2008 films
Films directed by Jan Hřebejk
Czech comedy films
2000s Czech films